Tennant is a Scottish surname, and may refer to:

 Alan Tennant (1930–1997), rugby league footballer of the 1940s and 1950s
 Alexander Tennant (1772–1814), British colonist of South Africa
 Amy Tennant (born 1994), English field hockey player
 Andrew Tennant (disambiguation) Andrew or Andy, multiple people
 Billy Tennant (footballer) 
 Charles Tennant (1768–1838), Scottish chemist and industrialist 
 Christopher Tennant (born 1978), Danish-American Ganjapreneur
 Clive Tennant (born 1956), English rugby league footballer of the 1970s
 David Tennant (disambiguation)
 Don Tennant (1922–2001), American advertising executive
 Dorothy Tennant (1855–1926), British artist
 Edward Tennant, 1st Baron Glenconner (1859–1920), British politician
 Edward Tennant (1897–1916), British poet
 Emma Tennant (1937–2017), British novelist
 Forest Tennant, American physician and advocate for opioid pain medications 
 Georgia Tennant (née Moffett) (b. 1984), English actress
 Harold Tennant (1865–1935), British politician
 Henry Tennant (disambiguation)
 Iain Tennant (1919–2006), British businessman
 James Tennant (disambiguation), multiple people
 Jan Tennant (born 1937), Canadian television journalist
 John Tennant (disambiguation), multiple people
 Kylie Tennant (1912–1988), Australian novelist, playwright and historian
 Natalie Tennant (born 1967), U.S. politician
 Neil Tennant (born 1954), British musician with the Pet Shop Boys
 Neil Tennant (philosopher) (born 1950)
 Nelson Tennant (1923–2006), English rugby league footballer of the 1940s
 Scott Tennant (born 1962), American classical guitarist, composer and member of the LAGQ
 Smithson Tennant (1761–1815), British chemist
 Stella Tennant (1970–2020), Scottish model 
 Stephen Tennant (1906–1987), British aristocratic eccentric
 Ty Tennant (born 2002), English actor
 Veronica Tennant (born 1946), Canadian ballerina
 Victoria Tennant (born 1950), British actress
 Walter Tennant (born 1921), English rugby league footballer of the 1930s, 1940s and 1950s
 William Tennant (United Irishmen) (1759-1832), Ulster Presbyterian banker and member of the Society of the United Irishmen
 William Tennant (poet) (1784–1848), Scottish poet
 William Tennant (Royal Navy officer) (1890–1963), Royal Navy officer

See also

 Baron Glenconner, family name Tennant
 Tennent
 Enriqueta Augustina Rylands, née Tennant